Manchester Square is an 18th-century garden square in Marylebone, London. It is a small Georgian predominantly 1770s-designed instance in central London; construction began around 1776. The north side has a central mansion, Hertford House, flanked by approach ways; its first name was Manchester House — its use is since 1897 as the Wallace Collection (gallery/museum) of fine and decorative arts sits alongside the Madame Tussauds museum and the Wigmore Hall concert rooms. The square forms part of west Marylebone, most of which sees minor but overarching property interests held by one owner (through lease reversions managed as the Portman Estate) among which many buildings have been recognised by statutory protection (as listed buildings).

Notable residents
Among residents figured: 
Admiral Sir Thomas Foley and his noble wife (later widow) at №1; 
Julius Benedict, German-born composer, at №2
John Hughlings Jackson, English neurologist, at №3
Alfred, Lord Milner, British statesman and colonial administrator, at №14
Timothy Yeats Brown, British banker.
Edward Henry Sieveking, English physician.

Listed buildings
№s1-3
№s4-7
1A Duke Street (has equal face to any lower numbers on this square)
2A Duke Street (as mentioned)
№s8-11
№s12-14
Hertford House
№s22-25
№26

Spanish Place
This six-house long approach fronts the east side of Hertford House (or its small public front lawn with steps, benches and paths). The first five buildings of Spanish Place are those listed, in the mainstream, initial category of Grade II. They were built c.1780-90, associated with the Duke of Manchester's development of the square, on Portman land. Their materials are brown brick, recessed slate roofs above five varying-prominence storeys with 3-window wide fronts. They have semicircular arched doorways to right; panelled doors with sidelights and fanlights; one a stuccoed Doric porch. Their windows are recessed sashes, in stuccoed reveals, under flat gauged arches. Reaching out below the first floor is a stucco plat band, painted stone or stucco cornice over the next, then a stucco cornice and blocking course marking the attic storey. Original, cast iron, geometric patterned balconies adorn the first floor. Cast iron area railings with urn finials enclose the front. №3 has a blue plaque as the home of Captain Marryat and George Grossmith.

In film, fiction and the media
In 1814 and 1815, the square was the chosen setting for cheaper newspapers and, above all, their inner page articles to perpetuate a fresh round of the urban myth of a pig-faced woman.

The cover photograph for Please Please Me, the first LP by The Beatles, was taken by Angus McBean in 1963. It showed the group looking down over the stairwell inside EMI House in the square, EMI's London headquarters (now demolished). A repeat photo was taken in 1969 for the cover of their then-intended Get Back album; it was not used when the project saw release as Let It Be, but was eventually used on the retrospective albums 1962–1966 and 1967–1970.

In the early 20th century, the chemical company ICI moved into a new headquarters in the north-west corner of the square, which was designed in a modern style with classical elements. Around the rest of the square stand tall brick Georgian terraced houses, many of which are inside converted to offices.

Manchester Square Fire Station, just over a full block north-west, in retail/leisure street Chiltern Street, was decommissioned in June 2005 by the London Fire and Emergency Planning Authority (LFEPA) and, expanding further south, forms a luxury hotel and restaurant.

References
Georgian London (1945) by Sir John Summerson. .

Squares in the City of Westminster
Portman estate
Marylebone
Garden squares in London
Communal gardens